Kim Young-Joo (hangul: 김영주; born December 30, 1957) is a former South Korean football referee, who officiated at the 2002 FIFA World Cup.

References

1957 births
Living people
2002 FIFA World Cup referees
South Korean football referees
CONCACAF Gold Cup referees
AFC Asian Cup referees
FIFA Confederations Cup referees